Fredrik Bakkman (previously Fredrik Johansson; born 29 July 1986) is a Swedish orienteering competitor. He was born in Borås.

He won a gold medal in the relay in the 2014 World Orienteering Championships in Asiago-Lavarone with the Swedish team, and placed 6th in the long distance. At the 2016 World Orienteering Championships in Strömstad he won a bronze medal in relay with the Swedish team, along with Gustav Bergman and William Lind.

As a junior, he won a silver medal in the relay at the 2006 Junior World Championships in Druskininkai, where he also placed seventh in the long course.

References

External links

1986 births
Living people
Swedish orienteers
Male orienteers
Foot orienteers
World Orienteering Championships medalists
People from Borås
Sportspeople from Västra Götaland County
Junior World Orienteering Championships medalists